Sur les Traces de Black Eskimo is the second full–length released by Les Georges Leningrad. It was released on 28 September 2004 by Alien8 Recording.

Track listing
 "Missing Gary" – 4:28
 "Sponsorships" – 3:15
 "Black Eskimo" – 3:06
 "Nebraska's Valentine" – 3:25
 "Umiarjuaq" – 2:23
 "Wunderkind #2" – 2:27
 "Supa Doopa" – 3:47
 "St. Mary's Memorial Hall" – 4:59
 "Pekin Pekin" – 2:40
 "Richard" – 0:55
 "Fifi F." – 3:21
 "Comment te Dire Adieu?" – 3:59

External links
Les Georges Leningrad official website
Alien8 Recordings
Sur les Traces de Black Eskimo at Amazon.com

Les Georges Leningrad albums
2004 albums
Alien8 Recordings albums